
The city of Cape Girardeau, Missouri, is the most populous city in Missouri's 8th congressional district and southeastern Missouri which is sometimes known as the Missouri Bootheel.

List of Mayors

Cape Girardeau mayors since 1843, when the city was incorporated.

Cape Girardeau